The World Athletics Race Walking Team Championships is a racewalking event organised by World Athletics. It has been held since 1961, and generally on a biennial basis. The first women's edition of the event happened in 1979. It was formerly known as the Lugano Cup after the city that hosted the first event, then became the IAAF World Race Walking Cup until 2016 and then IAAF World Race Walking Team Championships until 2018. In 2004, a junior division was added for athletes between 16 and 20. Since 2008 it has been a constituent meeting of the World Athletics Challenge – Race Walking.

From 1975 to 1997 was awarded Lugano Trophy for combined team (20K + 50K). Since 1993 the medals have been awarded for the single events of the 20K and 50K teams, therefore in the 1993, 1995 and 1997 editions three team medals were assigned, from 1999 the combined was abolished and the team medals remained two until the present day.

Host cities

The 2016 Cup was due to be held in Cheboksary, Russia. However the IAAF's suspension of the All-Russia Athletic Federation prohibits Russia from hosting international competitions. This event was relocated.

The 2020 Championships, planned in Minsk, Belarus, was postponed due to the COVID-19 pandemic. World Athletics announce Oman to host 2022 Race during 2020 Summer Olympics.

Events

Championships records
Key:

Men

Women

Medal summary
Legend: Where there is the symbol , the original top three result has been adjusted due to doping disqualifications.

Men

20 km

35 km

50 km

In 2012, original gold medallist Sergey Kirdyapkin, Igor Erokhin original silver medallist and fourth-placer Sergey Bakulin all from Russia, had their times and placings annulled due to doping violations.

Lugano Trophy

Team ranking that combining results of 20 km and 50 km.

Teams 20 km

Teams 35 km

Teams 50 km

Women

5 km

† Invitational, non-cup event.

10 km

20 km

35 km

50 km

Teams 20 km
* Invitation event

Teams 35 km

Teams 50 km

Medal table

Individual overall
Men and women senior and junior only individual events update to 2022 edition.

Individual senior

Individual junior

Doping
The competition conducts doping tests on participating athletes and several have been disqualified from the races as a result. Ukraine's Olga Leonenko became the first doping disqualification, having originally finished seventh in 1995. Daniel Plaza became the first man in 1997 and was again disqualified in 1999. Nine years passed without incident then in 2008 two Russians were excluded Viktor Burayev and Vladimir Kanaykin – the latter was the first athlete to be stripped of a medal at the cup.

In 2010 fourth place Erik Tysse was removed. Four athletes were disqualified for doping at the 2012 edition: silver medallist Igor Yerokhin was the most prominent, followed by fifth place Sergey Morozov, then Turkish walkers Recep Çelik and Handan Koçyiğit Cavdar. Yuriy Andronov became the fifth Russian to be caught doping at the event in 2014.

Outside of the event, several medallists have been later disqualified for doping, including women's winners Olga Kaniskina and Elena Lashmanova, and men's runners-up Valeriy Borchin and Alex Schwazer.

See also
European Race Walking Cup
Pan American Race Walking Cup
South American Race Walking Championships
Asian Race Walking Championships
Oceania Race Walking Championships
Central American Race Walking Championships

References

External links
 Official competition webpage
 gbrathletics.com
 IAAF World Race Walking Cup 1961-2006 Facts & Figures
 IAAF WORLD RACE WALKING TEAM CHAMPIONSHIPS - FACTS & FIGURES

 
Race Walking Cup
Racewalking competitions
Recurring sporting events established in 1961
Race Walking